Ghulam Mujtaba Isran is a Pakistani politician who had been a Member of the Provincial Assembly of Sindh, from May 2013 to May 2018.

Early life 
He was born on 11 December 1943 in Khairpur Joso, Larkana District.

Political career
He was elected to the Provincial Assembly of Sindh as a candidate of Pakistan Peoples Party from Constituency PS-39 KAMBAR SHAHDADKOT-I in 2013 Pakistani general election.

References

Living people
Sindh MPAs 2013–2018
1943 births
Pakistan People's Party politicians